Tager is a Norman French surname. Notable people with the surname include:

Aron Tager (1934–2019), American-Canadian actor, poet, artist, and sculptor
Helen Tager-Flusberg, English-American psychologist
Osias Tager (1914–2005), British businessman

See also
Sager

Norman-language surnames